The Distress, Gypsys Rhapsodie is a book of poems by Tomislav Dretar.

Poetry collections